Mághnus Breathnach is an Irish Gaelic footballer who plays as a goalkeeper for the Galway senior football team since making his debut in 2013 to succeed Adrian Faherty who emigrated to London.
He also plays club for An Spidéal.

References

1991 births
Living people
Spiddal Gaelic footballers
Gaelic football goalkeepers
Galway inter-county Gaelic footballers